Standard Oil most commonly refers to an American oil company that operated from 1870 to 1911 

Standard Oil may also refer to one of these successors of the original Standard Oil: 

Standard Oil of Brazil
 Standard Oil of California, later rebranded to Chevron
 Standard Oil of Illinois
 Standard Oil of Indiana, also called Stanolind, then Amoco, which merged with BP
 Standard Oil of Iowa
 Standard Oil of Kansas, spun off from Kentucky Standard
 Standard Oil of Kentucky, or Kyso, today part of Chevron
 Standard Oil of Louisiana, formed by New Jersey Standard
 Standard Oil of Minnesota
 Standard Oil of Missouri, spun off from Kentucky Standard
 Standard Oil of Nebraska, spun off from Indiana Standard
 Standard Oil of New Jersey, today part of ExxonMobil
 Standard Oil of New York, today part of ExxonMobil
 Standard Oil of Ohio, also called Sohio, which merged with BP